is the fourth studio album of Hello! Project member Kaori Iida; it is also her first solo album that was released after her graduation from the girl group Morning Musume. Unlike her first three albums, it contains songs of both Japanese and European languages. It was released on December 21, 2005 with the catalog number EPCE-2031.

Track listing 
 Bloom
 
 
 
 
 
 
 
 
 
 
 Papillon

External links 
 Plein D'amour: Ai ga Ippai entry at the Up-Front Works Official website

2005 albums
Kaori Iida albums
Chichūkai Label albums